Debar Mountain is a  mountain located in Adirondack Mountains of New York. It is located north-northeast of the hamlet of Paul Smiths in Franklin County. The mountain was the site of a  steel lookout tower, which was removed in 1979.

History
In 1912, the Conservation Department built a wood fire lookout tower on the mountain. In 1918, the Conservation Commission replaced it with a  Aermotor LS40 tower. Due to increased aerial detection, the tower ceased fire lookout operations at the end of the 1970 season and was later removed in 1979.

References

Mountains of Franklin County, New York
Mountains of New York (state)